Rajpur is a village in the Sonipat district of Haryana state, India.

Notes and references 

Villages in Sonipat district